Peptacetobacter hominis is a bacterium from the family Peptostreptococcaceae.

References

Bacteria described in 2020
Peptostreptococcaceae